Jean-Christophe Rolland (born 3 July 1968, in Condrieu) is a French competition rower and Olympic champion. Rolland won a gold medal in coxless pair at the 2000 Summer Olympics.

He succeeded Denis Oswald as President of FISA, the International Rowing Federation, in a ceremony held at Lucerne, Switzerland, in July 2014.  He was elected as a member of the International Olympic Committee in 2017.

References

External links 
 

1968 births
Living people
People from Condrieu
French male rowers
Olympic rowers of France
Rowers at the 1992 Summer Olympics
Rowers at the 1996 Summer Olympics
Rowers at the 2000 Summer Olympics
Olympic gold medalists for France
Olympic bronze medalists for France
Olympic medalists in rowing
Medalists at the 2000 Summer Olympics
Medalists at the 1996 Summer Olympics
International Olympic Committee members
World Rowing Championships medalists for France
Rowing officials
Sportspeople from Rhône (department)
20th-century French people
21st-century French people